The Private Lives of Adam and Eve is a 1960 Spectacolor comedy film starring Mickey Rooney (who also co-directed), and Mamie Van Doren. It is an American B-movie in which the plot revolves around a modern couple who dream that they are Adam and Eve. Others of their acquaintance assume the roles of various characters from the Book of Genesis during the fantasy sequences.

Plot
A bus heading toward Reno, Nevada, is being driven by Doc Bayles, whose passengers include a traveling salesman (Hal Sanders) and a runaway teen (Vangie Harper).

Feuding couples begin boarding. A waitress, Evie Simms, wants to go to Reno to divorce her husband Ad, having caught him kissing Lil Lewis, a neighbor. Lil wants a divorce from her own husband, casino boss Nick Lewis, who tries to catch up to the bus in a broken-down car belonging to Pinkie Parker, a beatnik.

A jealous Nick commandeers the bus when Doc briefly gets off and then inadvertently drives Ad off a cliff, nearly killing him. When a raging storm heads everyone's way, they take shelter in a church. Ad and Evie fall asleep and seem to have the same dream, that they are in the original Garden of Eden, facing temptations from the Devil that could affect the future of all mankind.

When they wake up, the storm has passed. The travelers pair off, Ad with Evie, and Lil with Nick, and Vangie with Pinkie, to see where the road takes them next.

Cast
 Mickey Rooney as Nick Lewis / The Devil
 Mamie Van Doren as Evie Simms / Eve
 Fay Spain as Lil Lewis / Lilith
 Mel Tormé as Hal Sanders
 Martin Milner as Ad Simms / Adam
 Tuesday Weld as Vangie Harper
 Cecil Kellaway as Doc Bayles
 Paul Anka as Pinkie Parker
 Ziva Rodann as Passiona
 Theona Bryant as Sensuosa
 June Wilkinson as Saturday 
 Phillipa Fallon as Desire
 Barbara Walden as Dancer
 Toni Covington as Devil's Familiar
 Nancy Root as Monday

Production
In July 1957, Albert Zugsmith announced he would make a film about Adam and Eve as part of a multi-picture deal he had at MGM. George Peck was reported as working on the script. It was then reported that Richard Matheson would write a script based on a treatment by Robert Smith. Its working title was Flesh and the Devil.

The movie wound up not being made at MGM. It was a co-production between Famous Artists, the company of Albert Zugsmith, and Fryman, the company of Mickey Rooney and Red Doff; Universal distributed. Filming started on 7 July 1959.

Shooting was temporarily suspended when Rooney came down with German measles. Shooting finished in August.

"I pick my titles to get 'em into theatres", said Zugsmith. "Thousands of exhibitors say amen to that."

Paul Anka released the title song as a single.

Release
Universal planned to premiere the film simultaneously in all towns in the United States called "Paradise". However this was abandoned when it was discovered that there were only nine such towns; eight had a population of less than 500 and only two had movie theatres.

The National Legion of Decency gave the film a "Class C" or "condemned" rating, saying it was "blasphemous and sacrilegious" and resorts to "indecencies and pornography" that are "blatant violations of Judeo-Christian standards of modesty and decency."

The film was released nationally on 11 January 1961.

The Los Angeles Times said the cast was "professional" but that the script wasn't "too bright ... an unpleasant combination of scraps of professional piety and masses of suggestive buffoonery."

References

External links
 
The Private Lives of Adam and Eve at TCMDB
Joe Dante on The Private Lives of Adam and Eve at Trailers from Hell

1960 films
1960 comedy films
American comedy films
Universal Pictures films
Obscenity controversies in film
Cultural depictions of Adam and Eve
1960s English-language films
Films directed by Albert Zugsmith
1960s American films